Joe Sib, former frontman for the punk rock band Wax, as well as punk rock supergroup 22 Jacks, is the co-founder (along with Bill Armstrong) of SideOneDummy Records. Aside from working at the label, Sib is also active as a stand-up comic. He released his first comedy record, Joe Sib Nowhere Near the Top, in April 2017.

Joe Sib currently hosts The Basement on Dash Radio.

References

External links

SideOneDummy Records official website

Living people
American punk rock singers
SideOneDummy Records
22 Jacks members
Wax (American band) members
Year of birth missing (living people)